Byram is a city in Hinds County, Mississippi, United States. The population was 11,489 as of the 2010 census, up from 7,386 at the 2000 census, at which time it was an unincorporated census-designated place (CDP); in 2020, its population was 12,666. It is part of the Jackson metropolitan statistical area. It was incorporated for a second time in its history on June 16, 2009.

Geography
Byram is bordered to the north by the city of Jackson, the state capital, and to the south by Terry.

Interstate 55 passes through the east side of Byram, with access from Exits 81 and 85. I-55 leads north  to the center of Jackson and south  to New Orleans.

The Pearl River flows southward just east of the city limits.

Demographics

As of the 2020 United States census, there were 12,666 people, 4,491 households, and 3,107 families residing in the city; according to the 2020 census, its racial composition was 71.05% Black/African American, 25.17% non-Hispanic white, 0.08% Native American, 0.72% Asian, 0.02% Pacific islander, 2.05% mixed, and 0.93% Hispanic or Latino of any race.

Government
Byram is led by Richard White (Mayor) and the Board of Aldermen. In June 2010, Byram selected Gulfport Police Sgt. Luke Thompson, who grew up in Byram, as the city's first police chief. Thompson was given an operating budget of $1.8 million and charged with hiring 25 sworn police officers and 10 to 15 civilian employees, finding and furnishing a police headquarters, and purchasing vehicles and equipment. In June 2011, Byram selected Mississippi State Fire Academy Senior Instructor Marshall C. Robinson Jr. as the city's first fire chief. Robinson was given a direction that included the transition from a 100% volunteer fire department to a combination fire department. The City of Byram Fire Department has four sworn combat/administrators, 15 sworn combat/firefighters, 25 sworn reserve combat/firefighters, and one non-sworn officer. The city of Byram dedicated its first fire station on June 14, 2014.

Re-incorporation 
The bordering city of Jackson began attempting to annex Byram in 1991. That led to unhappiness on the part of residents who feared higher property taxes and poor city services such as slow police response and a lack of street repairs. Lawsuits between Jackson and local residents began in 2004. After his election as mayor of Jackson, Frank Melton stated that he did not want to continue attempts at annexation, but the suit continued.

The ruling was appealed to the Mississippi Supreme Court. On April 2, 2009, the Mississippi Supreme Court unanimously upheld the lower court's ruling. Jackson officials said they would ask for a rehearing. On April 17, 2009, the Mississippi Supreme Court granted an extension to attorneys for the city of Jackson to file a motion to reconsider the court's decision. Ultimately, Byram incorporated on June 16, 2009.

Education
Byram is served by the Hinds County School District. Residents of Byram are zoned to Gary Road Elementary School, Gary Road Intermediate School, Byram Middle School, and Terry High School in Terry.

Jackson/Hinds Library System operates the Beverly J. Brown Library behind the Byram city hall.

Notable people
 Ishmon Bracey, Delta blues guitarist
 Chad Bradford, former Major League Baseball relief pitcher
 Marcus Spriggs, former National Football League offensive guard

See also

 Byram Bridge - a historic bridge located southeast of Byram.

References

External links

 City of Byram official website
 Community website

Populated places established in 2009
Cities in Mississippi
Cities in Hinds County, Mississippi